Beverley Randolph (1754February 7, 1797) was an American politician from Virginia.  From 1788 to 1791, he served as the eighth Governor of Virginia.

Biography
Randolph was one of four children born to Peter Randolph, son of William Randolph II, and Lucille (Bolling) Randolph, at Turkey Island, a plantation in Henrico County in the Colony of Virginia. One of Randolph's siblings was Ann Bolling Randolph Fitzhugh, wife of William Fitzhugh.

Randolph was educated at The College of William and Mary and married Martha Cocke in 1775. He served in the militia during the American Revolutionary War, was a member of the Virginia Assembly, and was a member of the Virginia House of Delegates from 1777 to 1780. When George Wythe withdrew from the Philadelphia Convention of 1787, George Mason suggested that Randolph (who happened to be in Philadelphia at the time) be appointed in his place. The Council and governor decided that in light of the abilities of Virginia's remaining delegates, Wythe did not need to be replaced. Randolph was elected Governor of Virginia in 1788, the first to be elected after Virginia ratified the United States Constitution. He died on his farm near Green Creek in Cumberland County, Virginia.

Ancestry

See also

First Families of Virginia
Randolph family of Virginia

References

External links
 
Archival Records
A Guide to the Executive Papers of Governor Beverley Randolph, 1788–1791 at The Library of Virginia

1754 births
1797 deaths
American people of English descent
Bolling family of Virginia
Burials in Virginia
Governors of Virginia
Members of the Virginia House of Delegates
People from Cumberland County, Virginia
People from Henrico County, Virginia
Beverley
College of William & Mary alumni
Virginia militiamen in the American Revolution
Beverley family of Virginia
18th-century American politicians